Rowland Cardwell Frazee,  (May 12, 1921 – July 29, 2007) was a Canadian banker and former chairman and chief executive officer of the Royal Bank of Canada from 1979 to 1986.

Biography 
Born in Halifax, Nova Scotia, at age five, the family moved to St. Stephen, New Brunswick where his father had been appointed bank manager. At age eighteen, Rowland Frazee went to work as a clerk at his father's branch but following the outbreak of World War II he enlisted in the Canadian Army in 1941 serving overseas with The Carleton and York Regiment, First Canadian Infantry Division, with whom he participated in the July 1943 allied landings in Sicily. Wounded on three occasions, Frazee distinguished himself in the Italian campaign and in northwest Europe. At the time of his decommissioning in 1945 he held the rank of Major.

After the war, Frazee studied at Dalhousie University in Halifax, where he graduated with a Bachelor of Commerce degree in 1948. Resuming his banking career, he rose to become the Royal Bank's president in 1977 and assumed the role of chairman and chief executive officer in 1980. He retired from the bank on May 31, 1986, but remained a member of the board of directors until 1992.

In 1985, he was made an Officer of the Order of Canada and was promoted to Companion in 1991. In 2001, he was inducted into the New Brunswick Business Hall of Fame.

His son, Stephen Frazee, is a successful Toronto real estate broker and his daughter, Catherine Frazee, a former chair of the Ontario Human Rights Commission, is a retired Professor of Distinction at the Toronto Metropolitan University School of Disability Studies.

References

External links
 

1921 births
2007 deaths
Canadian Anglicans
Royal Bank of Canada presidents
Directors of Royal Bank of Canada
Canadian military personnel of World War II
Canadian Army officers
Canadian people of Scottish descent
Companions of the Order of Canada
Dalhousie University alumni
People from Halifax, Nova Scotia
People from St. Stephen, New Brunswick
Carleton and York Regiment
Royal New Brunswick Regiment